Zuzka Bebarová-Rujbrová (born 13 January 1951), is a Czech politician. She was a member of the Chamber of Deputies of the Czech Republic from 1996 to 2017, representing South Moravian Region for the Communist Party of Bohemia and Moravia

Career
She has served as a member of Committee on Petitions since 4 December 2013, and chair since 6 December. She also serves as a Member of the Committee on Security

References

Living people
1951 births
People from Jičín
Communist Party of Bohemia and Moravia MPs
Czech communists
20th-century Czech women politicians
21st-century Czech women politicians
Members of the Chamber of Deputies of the Czech Republic (1996–1998)
Members of the Chamber of Deputies of the Czech Republic (1998–2002)
Members of the Chamber of Deputies of the Czech Republic (2002–2006)
Members of the Chamber of Deputies of the Czech Republic (2006–2010)
Members of the Chamber of Deputies of the Czech Republic (2010–2013)
Members of the Chamber of Deputies of the Czech Republic (2013–2017)
Masaryk University alumni